The Paul Horn-Arena (until 2007 TüArena) is an indoor sporting arena located in Tübingen, Germany.  The capacity of the arena is 3,132 people. It is currently (2012/13) home to the Walter Tigers Tübingen (basketball), TV 1893 Neuhausen (handball) and TV Rottenburg (volleyball).

Indoor arenas in Germany
Basketball venues in Germany
Buildings and structures in Tübingen
Sports venues in Baden-Württemberg
Sport in Tübingen (region)